The 2017–18 Greek Volleyleague is the 50th national championship and the 8th under the Volleyleague name. It is the highest volleyball league in Greece. Twelve teams were participating in the 2017–18 season; PAOK was the defending champion. Olympiacos Piraeus won its 28th championship.

Teams 
Twelve teams are participating in the 2017–18 season. The ten highest-ranked teams from the 2016–17 Volleyleague final standings were: PAOK, Olympiacos Piraeus, Panathinaikos Athens, Pamvohaikos Vocha, Kifissia, Foinikas Syros, Ethnikos Alexandroupolis, Iraklis Thessaloniki, Iraklis Chalkidas and Panachaiki. 
The two promoted teams from A2 Ethniki were Ethnikos Piraeus and Niki Aiginiou.
Two teams from the 2016–17 Volleyleague were demoted to A2 Ethniki: Kyzikos Nea Peramos and Orestiada.

Regular season 
The regular season is held in a round-robin format, every team contesting 22 games in total. At the end of the regular season, teams occupying positions 1–8 advance to the 2017–18 Volleyleague Greece Playoffs, while teams occupying positions 9–12 compete in the 2017–18 Volleyleague Greece Playouts.

League table

Results

Play out, positions 9−11 
Teams in positions 9-11 after the end of regular season participated in Play outs for the final classification in these positions.

Table

Results

Playoffs, positions 1−8 
Teams in positions 1-8 after the end of regular season participated in Play off for the final classification.

Round of 8 
The four pairings for the Round of 8 were determined from the positions after the end of the regular season. The pairings were between the teams in 1st–8th, 2nd–7th, 3rd–6th and 4th–5th positions of the regular season. The first team in two victories advancers to the next round.
The four eliminated teams were placed in positions 5–8 according to the classification of the regular season.

(1) Olympiacos – (8) Pamvochaikos (2–0)

(2) PAOK – (7) Ethnikos Piraeus (2–0)

(3) Foinikas Syros – (6) Iraklis Chalkidas (2–0)

(4) Iraklis – (5) Kifissia (0–2)

Semifinals

(1) Olympiakos – (5) Kifissia (3–0)

(2) PAOK – (3) Foinikas Syros (2–0)

Finals

(1) Olympiakos – (2) PAOK (3–0)

Final standings

References

External links 
 Επίσημος ιστότοπος της ΕΣΑΠ www.volleyleague.gr
 Πρόγραμμα - Αποτελέσματα www.volleyleague.gr
 Βαθμολογία www.volleyleague.gr
 Προκήρυξη Πρωταθλήματος 2017–18 www.volleyleague.gr

Volleyball competitions in Greece
Volleyleague Greece
Volleyleague Greece
2017 in Greek sport
Volleyleague Greece
Greece